Grenoble is the main railway station located in Grenoble, Isère, France. The station was opened on 3 January 1849 and is located on the Lyon–Marseille (via Grenoble) railway and Grenoble–Montmélian railway. The train services are operated by SNCF.

The station was rebuilt in 1967 for the 1968 Winter Olympics. The station is currently undergoing reconstruction, which includes the electrification of the Valence-Grenoble route and the Grenoble-Chambéry route.

Train services
The station is served by the following services:

High speed services (TGV) Paris - Grenoble
Regional services (TER Auvergne-Rhône-Alpes) Lyon - Bourgoin - La-Tour-du-Pin - Grenoble
Regional services (TER Auvergne-Rhône-Alpes) Valence - Grenoble - Chambéry - Aix-les-Bains - Annecy
Regional services (TER Auvergne-Rhône-Alpes) Valence - Grenoble - Chambéry - Aix-les-Bains - Bellegarde - Geneva
Local services (TER Auvergne-Rhône-Alpes) Grenoble - Université - Montmélian - Chambéry
Local services (TER Auvergne-Rhône-Alpes) Valence - Valence TGV - Romans-Bourg-de-Peage - St Marcellin - Moirans - Grenoble - Université
Local services (TER Auvergne-Rhône-Alpes) St-André-le-Gaz - Voiron - Moirans - Grenoble - Université
Local services (TER Auvergne-Rhône-Alpes) Grenoble - Monestier-de-Clermont - Veynes - Gap

Tram services

A (Fontaine - Gare - Centre Ville - Polesud - Échirolles - Denis Papin)
B (Presqu'Île - Cité Internationale - Gare - Centre Ville - La Tronche - Universités - Gières)

References

External links
 
 Timetables, TER Auvergne-Rhône-Alpes

Railway stations in Isère
Railway stations in France opened in 1858
Transport in Grenoble
Buildings and structures in Grenoble